Viktor Oskar Tilgner (25 October 1844 in Pressburg – 16 April 1896 in Vienna) was an Austrian sculptor and medailleur.

Life 
He was the son of Captain Carl Tilgner. The family moved to Vienna when he was a child. His talent was recognized early by the sculptor , who became his first teacher. Then, at the Academy of Fine Arts, he studied under Franz Bauer and Josef Gasser. Later, he was attracted to engraving and worked with the medailleur .
One of Tilgner's student's was German sculptor John Walz.

He belonged to the circle of artists around Count Karol Lanckoroński. During the World Exhibition of 1873, he met the French sculptor Gustave Deloye, who strongly influenced his work. The following year, he took a trip to Italy with Hans Makart, whose "realistic academicism" also influenced Tilgner's style. For the last twenty years of his life, he had a large studio in what was originally a greenhouse at the Palais Schwarzenberg

Despite a long-standing heart condition and recurring chest pain, he spent a strenuous day working on his Mozart monument, to get it ready on schedule. He died of a heart attack the next morning. Often considered to be his greatest work, the monument was unveiled a few days after his death. The bulk of his estate was bequeathed to his hometown and is now on display at the Bratislava City Gallery.

Selected major works
 Statue of Leopold V, Duke of Austria at the Heeresgeschichtliches Museum
 Statue of Peter Paul Rubens at the Künstlerhaus
 Statues at the Kunsthistorisches Museum: Christian Daniel Rauch, Peter von Cornelius and Moritz von Schwind.
 Statues at the Naturhistorisches Museum: Alexander von Humboldt, Leopold von Buch, Isaac Newton and Carl Linnaeus.
 Statues at the Austrian Parliament building: Archimedes, Marcus Terentius Varro, Homer and Phidias.
Statues at the Telfair Academy building: Phidias, Raphael and Rembrandt
 Figures at the Burgtheater: Don Juan, Phaidra, Falstaff, Hanswurst, William Shakespeare, Pedro Calderón de la Barca, Molière, Gotthold Ephraim Lessing, Johann Wolfgang von Goethe, Friedrich Schiller, Friedrich Hebbel, Franz Grillparzer and Karl Felix Halm.
 Monument for Josef Werndl, Steyr
 Monument for Anton Bruckner in the Stadtpark. Due to vandalism, the female figure was removed and replaced with a simple pedestal.
 Monument for Johann Nepomuk Hummel, Bratislava
 Monument for Dr Johann Nepomuk Prix, Wiener Zentralfriedhof
 Monument for Franz Liszt, Ödenburg

References

Further reading 
 Gerhardt Kapner: Ringstraßendenkmäler. In: Renate Wagner-Rieger, Die Wiener Ringstraße. Bild einer Epoche. Die Erweiterung der Inneren Stadt Wien unter Kaiser Franz Joseph. Vol.9,1. Steiner, Wiesbaden 1973, 
 Maria Pötzl-Malikova: Die Plastik der Ringstraße. Künstlerische Entwicklung 1890–1918. In: Renate Wagner-Rieger, Die Wiener Ringstraße. Bild einer Epoche. Die Erweiterung der Inneren Stadt Wien unter Kaiser Franz Joseph. Vol.9,2. Steiner, Wiesbaden 1976, .
 Walter Krause: Die Plastik der Ringstraße von der Spätromantik bis zur Wende um 1900. In: Renate Wagner-Rieger: Die Wiener Ringstraße. Bild einer Epoche. Die Erweiterung der Inneren Stadt Wien unter Kaiser Franz Joseph. Vol.9,3. Steiner, Wiesbaden 1980, .
 Contribution by Walter Krause in: Jane Turner: The Dictionary of Art. Vol.30: Summonte to Tinne. Grove, New York 1996, pgs.888–890.

External links 

 .
 .
 Bundesdenkmalamt Österreich: Hauptwerk von Viktor Tilgner gerettet. Wiener Zentralfriedhof. Allegorie der Bildhauerei
 Ludwig Hevesi: Obituary in Wiener Totentanz online

Austrian sculptors
Austrian male sculptors
Artists from Bratislava
1844 births
1896 deaths
19th-century sculptors
Artists from Vienna